The discography of Norwegian urban duo Madcon consists of seven studio albums, eighteen singles and one compilation album.

Albums

Studio albums

Compilation albums

Singles

As lead artist

As featured artist

References

External links
 Official Norwegian site
 Discogs page

Discographies of Norwegian artists